xxxHolic is an anime adaptation of a manga series written by Clamp. It was developed by Production I.G and directed by Tsutomu Mizushima. The season aired on Tokyo Broadcasting System on April 6, 2006 in Japan and ended on September 28, 2006, with 24 episodes in total. The first season was licensed by Funimation Entertainment in July 2007.

This season uses three pieces of theme music: one opening theme and two ending themes. " by Shikao Suga is used as the opening theme.



Episode list

References

2006 Japanese television seasons
XxxHolic